Jefferson is a city in Jefferson County, Wisconsin, United States, and is its county seat. It is at the confluence of the Rock and Crawfish rivers. The population was 7,793 at the 2020 census. The city is partially bordered by the Town of Jefferson.

History
Jefferson's location was selected to make use of the water power and transportation opportunities offered by the Rock River. It was the furthest point a steamboat could navigate the Rock in 1839.  Later bridges built downstream prevented such navigation.

Jefferson's founders were settlers from New England, particularly Connecticut, rural Massachusetts, Vermont, New Hampshire and Maine, as well some from upstate New York born to parents who had migrated there from New England shortly after the American Revolution. These people were "Yankees" descended from the English Puritans who settled New England in the 1600s. They were part of a wave of New England farmers who headed west into what was then the wilds of the Northwest Territory during the early 1800s. Most arrived as a result of the completion of the Erie Canal as well as the end of the Black Hawk War.

When they arrived in what is now Jefferson there was nothing but dense virgin forest and wild prairie, the New Englanders built farms, roads, and government buildings and established post routes. They brought many of their Yankee New England values, such as a passion for education, establishing many schools as well as staunch support for abolitionism. They were mostly members of the Congregationalist Church though some were Episcopalian. Due to the second Great Awakening some had converted to Methodism and others had become Baptists before moving to what is now Jefferson.  Jefferson, like much of Wisconsin, would be culturally very continuous with early New England culture for most of its early history.

During World War II, Camp Jefferson, a prison camp for German POWs, was erected at the Jefferson County Fairgrounds. The Jefferson County Fairgrounds hosted horse buggy racing prior to the renovations to the new fairgrounds.

Gemuetlichkeit Days was started in 1971 to celebrate the German heritage of many of the residents of the Jefferson area. The festival was first held under tents in the downtown area. The festival quickly grew and in 1975 the festival was moved to the Jefferson County Fair grounds and has been held there every year since then.

Geography
Jefferson is located at  (43.003091, -88.807855).

Demographics

2010 census
As of the census of 2010, there were 7,973 people, 3,132 households, and 1,989 families living in the city. The racial makeup of the city was 91.2% White, 0.7% African American, 0.4% Native American, 0.7% Asian, 0.1% Pacific Islander, 5.4% from other races, and 1.5% from two or more races. Hispanic or Latino of any race were 11.8% of the population.

There were 3,132 households, of which 32.5% had children under the age of 18 living with them, 47.8% were married couples living together, 10.4% had a female householder with no husband present, 5.3% had a male householder with no wife present, and 36.5% were non-families. 29.8% of all households were made up of individuals, and 13.2% had someone living alone who was 65 years of age or older. The average household size was 2.42 and the average family size was 3.00.

The median age in the city was 37.5 years. 24.4% of residents were under the age of 18; 7.8% were between the ages of 18 and 24; 27.8% were from 25 to 44; 24.4% were from 45 to 64; and 15.7% were 65 years of age or older. The gender makeup of the city was 49.8% male and 50.2% female.

2000 census

As of the census of 2000, there were 7,338 people, 2,816 households, and 1,819 families living in the city. The population density was 1,645.9 people per square mile (635.3/km2). There were 2,934 housing units at an average density of 658.1 per square mile (254.0/km2). The racial makeup of the city was 94.28% White, 0.53% Black or African American, 0.55% Native American, 0.46% Asian, 0.03% Pacific Islander, 3.04% from other races, and 1.12% from two or more races. 6.79% of the population were Hispanic or Latino of any race.

There were 2,816 households, out of which 30.9% had children under the age of 18 living with them, 50.8% were married couples living together, 10.2% had a female householder with no husband present, and 35.4% were non-families. 28.3% of all households were made up of individuals, and 12.0% had someone living alone who was 65 years of age or older. The average household size was 2.41 and the average family size was 2.96.

In the city, the population was spread out, with 22.8% under the age of 18, 9.8% from 18 to 24, 31.4% from 25 to 44, 20.1% from 45 to 64, and 16.1% who were 65 years of age or older. The median age was 36 years. For every 100 females, there were 98.4 males. For every 100 females age 18 and over, there were 94.7 males.

The median income for a household in the city was $40,962, and the median income for a family was $47,737. Males had a median income of $32,500 versus $25,142 for females. The per capita income for the city was $19,124. About 5.4% of families and 8.3% of the population were below the poverty line, including 11.2% of those under age 18 and 7.0% of those age 65 or over

Education
In Jefferson there are six schools: two elementary schools, one middle school, one high school, and two private schools. The names of the schools are East Elementary, West Elementary, Jefferson Middle School, Jefferson High School, St. John's Catholic, and St. John's Lutheran. East Elementary School was built as a public works project in 1939 during the Great Depression.  The fight song for Jefferson High School is a version of 'On Wisconsin' music with words dedicated to the students of JHS.

Economy
Valero Renewables is an ethanol plant located in Jefferson. There is also a Purina cat food manufacturing plant and a Generac Power Systems plant.

Notable people

 Claire B. Bird, Wisconsin state senator, born in Jefferson
 Ira W. Bird, Wisconsin State Representative and mayor of Jefferson
 Paul M. Blayney, U.S. Coast Guard admiral
 Christopher Grimm, Wisconsin State Representative, lived in Jefferson
 George Grimm, Wisconsin State Representative and judge, born in Jefferson
 Kenneth E. Gruennert, Medal of Honor recipient, attended school in Jefferson
 Robert Kirkland Henry, congressman, born in Jefferson
 Rosemary Kennedy, sister of President John F. Kennedy, lived in Jefferson
 Lance Leipold, Head football coach at the University of Kansas
 William W. Reed, Wisconsin state senator and representative, lived in Jefferson
 Oscar F. Roessler, Wisconsin State Representative and newspaper editor, was born in Jefferson
 Zeke Sanborn, Olympic gold medalist, born in Jefferson
 Joseph Stoppenbach, Wisconsin State Representative, born in Jefferson
 Wilbur H. Tousley, Wisconsin State Representative, lived in Jefferson

Notes

External links
 City of Jefferson official website
 Jefferson Area Chamber of Commerce
 Sanborn fire insurance maps: 1884 1892 1898 1904 1909 1914

Cities in Wisconsin
Cities in Jefferson County, Wisconsin
County seats in Wisconsin